Carl Bryan 'Stoney' Stonehewer (born 16 May 1972) is a former motorcycle speedway rider.

Career Landmarks

Speedway Grand Prix
 The first UK Premier League rider to qualify for the Speedway Grand Prix.
Grand Prix Series Rider 2000, 2001, 2002
Grand Prix Challenge 1999 (3rd), 2000 (2nd)

World Team Cup
 World Team Cup 2000, 2001, 2002 (Great Britain)
World Team Cup Silver Medal 2000

Premier League Pairs Championship
 A record five Premier League Pairs Championship titles with five different partners.
1997 with Martin Dixon
1999 with Brent Werner
2000 with Mick Powell
2001 with Peter I. Karlsson
2003 with Simon Stead

Workington Comets
 Record for most appearances for the Workington Comets.
 Stonehewer announced his retirement in early 2006  after suffering horrific friction burns in a freak racing accident in 2005.
 In April 2007 it was announced he was returning to the Workington Comets team.

Zielona Góra
Polish 2nd Division Champion 2000 (Zielona Góra)

Speedway Grand Prix results

References 

1972 births
Living people
British speedway riders
English motorcycle racers
Sportspeople from Manchester
Belle Vue Aces riders
Workington Comets riders
Sheffield Tigers riders
Long Eaton Invaders riders